Newton Dexter Burch (June 16, 1871 – March 17, 1931) was a justice of the South Dakota Supreme Court from 1926 to 1931.

Born on a farm in Stewartsville, Missouri, Burch was primarily a farmer in Texas and Nebraska until he was 23, thereafter receiving a law degree from the University of Nebraska in 1898. Burch entered the practice of law in Nebraska, practicing law there until 1907 and serving as the county attorney of Boyd County, Nebraska from 1903 to 1907. He then moved to Dallas, South Dakota, where he practiced law and served two terms as mayor. In 1921, Burch was elected to the South Dakota Eleventh Circuit court judge.

Personal life and death
In 1899, Burch married Sarah E. Jarman, with whom he had three children.

He died in Pierre, South Dakota at the age of 60, following an intracerebral hemorrhage.

References

1871 births
1931 deaths
People from DeKalb County, Missouri
University of Nebraska alumni
Justices of the South Dakota Supreme Court